Hiyy Yaara Dheefa is a 2011 Maldivian romantic drama film written and directed by Ahmed Azmeel. Produced under Yaaraa Productions, the film stars Ali Seezan, Niuma Mohamed, Aishath Rishmy, Ahmed Azmeel and Aminath Rasheedha in pivotal roles. The film was released on 11 October 2011. The film revolves around four young people from different social classes fall in love with partners who do not meet with their parents' approval. It also highlights a daughter's craving for her mother's affection and her mother's constant rejection of her.

Cast 
 Ali Seezan as Isham
 Niuma Mohamed as Anju
 Aishath Rishmy as Nathasha
 Ahmed Azmeel as Anil
 Aminath Rasheedha as Nahidha

Soundtrack

Release and response
The film was released on 11 October 2011. It received negative response from critics pointing similarities between Bollywood comedy-drama film Ishq (1997) and Kundan Shah's family drama Dil Hai Tumhaara (2002). Ahmed Nadheem from Haveeru wrote: "This is the most predictable Maldivian film I have watched so far. From the start to end, you can foretell the next scene, how its organized and so does the climax. Hiyy Yaara Dheefa is one boring-very much boring-Maldivian film I have watched". The film did not succeed financially, but performances were moderately acclaimed by critics.

Accolades

References

2011 films
Maldivian romantic drama films
Yaaraa Productions films
2011 romantic drama films
Dhivehi-language films